Globalization is the process of interaction and integration among people, companies, and governments worldwide.

Globalization may also refer to:

Globalization (album), by Pitbull, 2014
Globalizations, a peer-reviewed academic journal
Internationalization and localization of software and websites
Globalize (JavaScript library)

See also

Globalism
Trade-to-GDP ratio, a measure of the importance of international trade in the economy of a country